The Onyx Marble is a geologic formation in Arizona. It preserves fossils dating back to the Neogene period.

See also

 List of fossiliferous stratigraphic units in Arizona
 Paleontology in Arizona

References
 
 Onyx stone comprises different minerals, including quartz, feldspar, and agate.

Neogene Arizona